Tapah is a town and the capital of Batang Padang District, Perak, Malaysia.

Name
The name "Tapah" is said to be originated from the name of a freshwater fish, "Ikan Tapah". The scientific name of the fish is Wallago leeri.
The locals said that the name has been taken from the Perak Malay word which means "no worry".

Geography
The Batang Padang River flows through this town. Major neighbouring towns are Kampar and Bidor. The Lata Kinjang waterfall is about 18 km from Tapah on the road to Chenderiang. It is an impressive series of cascades down a 100 m drop. The falls can be seen from the North–South Expressway (PLUS).

Transport
Tapah is located on the trunk road between Kuala Lumpur and Ipoh. There is an entrance to the North–South Expressway at Tapah. This town is also widely considered as the main entry point into the old Cameron Highlands route, which is a winding and narrow road uphill. The nearest train station is Tapah Road.

References

Batang Padang District
Towns in Perak